Ballencrieff (Scottish Gaelic: Baile na Craoibhe) is a rural community in East Lothian, Scotland. It is located between the towns of Aberlady, Drem, Haddington and Longniddry and is approximately 20 miles from Edinburgh. The name comes from the Scottish Gaelic Baile na Craoibhe meaning "Town of the green".

There is a prehistoric enclosure at Ballencrieff Mains which is a Scheduled Ancient Monument.

The village comprises typical rural housing, and there was some industry in the past. There is a farm and farm shop which breeds rare breed pigs. Nearby Ballencrieff Castle was built in 1507. This was the seat of the Murray family, the Lords Elibank, and James Murray, who was the governor of Quebec was born here in 1721.

There was a brickworks in Ballencrieff which was shown on a 1799 map and in 1837 a George Reid was recorded as a brick and tile maker. In 1838 the Marquess of Tweeddale tested a tile making machine at this site. It was still recorded on a map in 1853 and in 1867 William Brodie was recorded as a brick and tile manufacturer. It was last recorded in 1915 when the Edinburgh Evening News reported that the farmer G. Sinclair, who had been farming the land, bought the site from Lord Elibank.

In 1846–1847 there was a railway station at Ballencrieff on the North British Railway, the East Coast Main Line still passes to the north of the settlement. The roundabout and whereabouts are also known for being something of a black spot for road traffic accidents, for example a fire engine crashed there in 2015 and an unconscious driver crashed into one of the roadside houses pictured above.

See also
 List of places in East Lothian

References

External links

 Ballencrieff Rare Breed Pigs
 Ballencrieff Castle for sale in 2006

Villages in East Lothian